Cucumella may refer to:
 Cucumella (echinoderm), a genus of echinoderms in the family Cucumellidae
 Cucumella, a genus of plants in the family Cucurbitaceae, synonym of Cucumis